Gargela obliquivitta is a moth in the family Crambidae. It was described by George Hampson in 1917. It is found on the Maluku Islands in Indonesia.

References

Crambinae
Moths described in 1917
Moths of Indonesia